Hyptis argutifolia is a species of flowering plant in the family Lamiaceae. It is found only in Ecuador. Its natural habitat is subtropical or tropical moist montane forests.

References

argutifolia
Flora of Ecuador
Critically endangered plants
Taxonomy articles created by Polbot